The A1 is a motorway in the Netherlands. The road connects the capital city of Amsterdam, near the interchange of Watergraafsmeer, with the German border, near Oldenzaal and Bad Bentheim, and the German Autobahn BAB 30. On its way, it crosses four provinces: North Holland, Utrecht, Gelderland and Overijssel.

European routes 

The section of the road between its start at the interchange Watergraafsmeer, and the interchange of Hoevelaken near Amersfoort, is also a European route: the E231. This section of the A1 is the complete E231 route; the E231 does not consist of any other road or section.

Between the interchange Hoevelaken and the German border (and beyond, along the BAB 30), the European route E30 follows the A1 motorway. This European route is a so-called A-Class West-East European route, going from Cork in Ireland all the way to Omsk in Russia.

Exit list

References

External links

Constituent roads of European route E30
Motorways in the Netherlands
Motorways in Gelderland
Motorways in North Holland
Motorways in Overijssel
Motorways in Utrecht (province)